Mother, May I Sleep with Danger? may refer to:
 Mother, May I Sleep with Danger? (1996 film), a television film
 Mother, May I Sleep with Danger? (2016 film), an American television thriller film
 Mother, May I Sleep with Danger?, a song by Joy Crookes